Garry Halliday is a British television series for children on the BBC from 1959 to 1962. The show starred Terence Longdon as airman Garry Halliday. The episodes were based on books by Justin Blake: Justin Blake was in fact a pseudonym for the writers John Griffith Bowen and Jeremy Bullmore.

Plot
Reminiscent of Biggles, Halliday was a pilot for a commercial airline, Halliday Charter Company, and flew to his adventures in an aircraft with the call sign Golf Alpha Oboe Roger George. He was assisted by co-pilot Bill Dodds, played by Terence Alexander, who was later Charlie in Bergerac. The airline's control base station was Lima Foxtrot.

Their enemy was The Voice, played by Elwyn Brook-Jones, so called because he was never seen by other characters, so that at the end of each series he could escape and reappear in the next. Invisible even to his own gang, The Voice at first shone a powerful light in their faces to disguise his identity; later he used closed-circuit television.

Production
Based on the books by Justin Blake, one trailer special and two series were produced. Each episode lasted 25 minutes:
Garry Halliday – 1 episode
Garry Halliday and the Gun-Runners – 16 episodes
Garry Halliday and the Secret of Omar Khayyam – 33 episodes

Series three hit difficulties, as actor Bill Kerr playing co-pilot Eddie Robbins replaced Terence Alexander; while Brook-Jones died halfway through filming, and was replaced (without his scenes being refilmed) by an actor who looked and sounded different. Maurice Kaufmann played one of The Voice's henchmen in series three.

Filming was at Ferryfield Airport in Lydd, Kent, with the offices and planes of Silver City Airways transformed for all three series.

The programme was transmitted in the Saturday afternoon teatime slot subsequently occupied by Doctor Who, which started on BBC in November 1963. It was a popular slot for a family audience.  In early 1963, it was used for another adventure series for children, The Chem. Lab. Mystery.  After the success of the first series of Doctor Who, with its sci-fi content, there appeared no interest in returning to the more traditional Garry Halliday stories and the show was dropped. Only one episode survives in the BBC archives.

In popular culture
Garry Halliday makes an appearance in The Black Dossier by Alan Moore, his name slightly altered to Gary Haliday, encountering Mina Murray and Alan Quatermain in a new spaceport in Birmingham. The Voice is mentioned in passing in a fictional document detailing The League's activities during World War II (When They Sound The Last All Clear).

References

External links 
Garry Halliday at BFI Film & TV Database

1950s British children's television series
1960s British children's television series
1959 British television series debuts
1962 British television series endings
Aviation television series
BBC Television shows
Halliday, Garry
Halliday, Garry
Lost BBC episodes
Series of books